Thakarpada  is a village in the Palghar district of Maharashtra, India. It is located in the Talasari taluka. It lies on the national highway 48 .

Demographics 

According to the 2011 census of India, Thakarpada  has 831 households. The effective literacy rate (i.e. the literacy rate of population excluding children aged 6 and below) is 75.81%.

References 

Villages in Talasari taluka